The Kington Tramway was an early narrow gauge horse-drawn tramway that linked limestone quarries at Burlinjob in Radnorshire to Eardisley in Herefordshire.

Parliamentary authorisation, construction and opening

The tramway received parliamentary authorisation on 23 May 1818. Construction started immediately and was completed in two sections. The tramway adopted the use of cast iron 'L'-shaped tramroad plates in its construction. The vertical portions of the two plates were positioned inside the wheels of the tramway wagons and the plates were spiked to stone blocks for stability. The first section from Eardisley to Kington was opened on 1 May 1820.

Operation of the tramway

For the tramway's opening, an end-on connection was made with the Hay Railway, also a  plateway.  This co-operative arrangement allowed the through working of wagons, pulled by horses, along a continuous  line to wharves on the Brecknock and Abergavenny Canal.

The tramway was intended solely for the carriage of goods and minerals, and therefore did not carry any passengers.

Merger and subsequent use

The Kington Tramway was acquired by the Kington and Eardisley Railway in 1862.  The new company used much of the line of the tramway to build its standard-gauge railway, utilising normal rails and steam locomotives, between Eardisley and Kington.

References

Notes

Bibliography

 
 

Pre-grouping British railway companies
Early British railway companies
Rail transport in Herefordshire
Rail transport in Powys
3 ft 6 in gauge railways in England
3 ft 6 in gauge railways in Wales
Railway companies established in 1818
Railway lines opened in 1820
Railway companies disestablished in 1862
Horse-drawn railways
1818 establishments in England
British companies established in 1818
Kington, Herefordshire